Denton is a hamlet and civil parish in the Harrogate district of North Yorkshire, England. At the 2011 Census the population of this civil parish was less than 100. Details are included in the civil parish of Middleton, Harrogate. Denton Hall is located in the hamlet. The church in the village is noted for some its windows which instead of stained glass, are panels where the artists have painted directly onto the glass.

The name Denton comes from Old English and means farmstead or village in a valley.

Notable people
The area around Denton is notable as being the birthplace of several members of the Fairfax family;
Thomas Fairfax, 1st Lord Fairfax of Cameron (1560–1640), built the estate up at Denton
Ferdinando Fairfax, 2nd Lord Fairfax of Cameron (1584–1648)
Thomas Fairfax (1612–1671)

References

External links

Villages in North Yorkshire
Civil parishes in North Yorkshire